Indra Bahadur Khatri is a Nepalese politician. He contested the 1999 legislative election in the Kanchanpur-3 constituency on behalf of the Rashtriya Prajatantra Party (Chand). Khatri came second, with 8336 votes.

References

Living people
Rastriya Prajatantra Party (Chand) politicians
Year of birth missing (living people)
Place of birth missing (living people)